Dimitrie P. Vioreanu (1831–October 24, 1881) was a Romanian jurist and politician.

Vioreanu studied in his native country, completing his education abroad. He taught at the Law faculty of Bucharest University from its establishment until his death. He served three terms as Justice Minister: August-October 1863, February-April 1870 and April 1876. In his last years, he was lead prosecutor at the Court of Cassation.

Notes

1831 births
1881 deaths
Romanian jurists
Romanian prosecutors
Academic staff of the University of Bucharest
Romanian Ministers of Justice